Oxygen (branded on air as Oxygen True Crime) is an American television channel owned by the NBCUniversal Television and Streaming unit of NBCUniversal, a subsidiary of Comcast. The channel primarily airs true crime programming and dramas targeted towards women.

The network was founded by Geraldine Laybourne, and carried a format focused on lifestyle and entertainment programming oriented towards women, similar to competing channels such as Lifetime. NBCUniversal acquired the network in 2007; under NBCU ownership, the network increasingly produced reality shows aimed at the demographic, and was relaunched in 2014 to target a "modern," younger female audience. After the network experienced ratings successes with a programming block dedicated to such programming, Oxygen was relaunched in mid-2017 to focus primarily on true-crime programs.

As of February 2015, approximately 77.5 million American households (66.5% of households with television) receive Oxygen. Under its current format, the network primarily competes with Investigation Discovery and HLN.

History

The privately held company Oxygen Media was founded in 1998 by former Nickelodeon executive Geraldine Laybourne, talk-show host Oprah Winfrey, media executive Lisa Gersh, and producers Marcy Carsey, Tom Werner and Caryn Mandabach (of Carsey-Werner fame). Laybourne was the service's founder, chairwoman, and CEO, staying with the channel until the NBCUniversal sale. The company's subscription network Oxygen launched on February 2, 2000.

The channel's first headquarters were at Battery Park City in New York City, near the World Trade Center. It was knocked off the air on September 11, 2001; the Time Warner Cable-owned regional news channel NY1 was broadcast to all Oxygen subscribers across the country until the studio reopened within a week after the attack.

The network's operations were later consolidated in the Chelsea Market, a former Nabisco factory at 15th Street and Ninth Avenue in New York City. Oxygen's operations are now based at 30 Rockefeller Plaza as part of Comcast's consolidation of its newly owned NBC Universal properties.

The channel originally began as an interactive service focusing on original programming with some reruns (such as Kate & Allie), and featured a black bar at the bottom of the screen (referred to as "the stripe", occupying the bottom 12% of the screen) which would show various information (the interactive part involved the channel's website); the technique was cloned by Spike's precursor The New TNN; the stripe was eventually dropped. Prior to 2005, the channel carried a limited schedule of regular season WNBA games produced by NBA TV. The channel later began to focus chiefly on reality shows, reruns, and movies. For a time during the talk show's syndication run, Oxygen aired week-delayed repeats of The Tyra Banks Show. The yoga/meditation/exercise program Inhale was the last inaugural Oxygen program on air into the channel's NBC Universal era, albeit in repeats; it was cancelled in 2010.

Campus Ladies, Bliss, Oprah After the Show, Talk Sex with Sue Johanson, The Janice Dickinson Modeling Agency, Snapped, Girls Behaving Badly and Bad Girls Club, a reality series, were the highlight shows of the network at this time. Oxygen launched with immediate DirecTV carriage, and arrived on Dish Network in early 2006 during that provider's carriage conflict with Lifetime.

Acquisition by NBCUniversal and Comcast 

On October 9, 2007, NBCUniversal announced it would be purchasing Oxygen for $925 million. The sale was completed on November 20, 2007. NBC Universal's cable division announced at an industry upfront presentation on April 23, 2008, that the channel would rebrand and unveil a new logo on June 17, 2008; in the months since the sale the Oh! heading was dropped from the channel's visual branding. The logo premiered one week early on June 8, 2008.

For the 2008 Summer Olympics, Oxygen aired events and programming weeknights relating to gymnastics, equestrian, and synchronized swimming through NBC's Olympic broadcasts. On June 29, 2009, Oxygen premiered Dance Your Ass Off, a reality dance competition program in which overweight people dance while they lose weight; the program was cancelled after its second season due to low ratings. On April 5, 2010, Oxygen launched its second night of original programming with the fifth-season premiere of Tori & Dean: Home Sweet Hollywood.

Following the acquisition of NBC Universal by Comcast and the last-minute replacement of its subscription channel Style Network with Esquire Network (which was originally intended to replace G4) on September 23, 2013, some of its acquired programs were dispersed to Oxygen.

In April 2014, as part of a gradual re-focusing of NBCU's women's pay-TV networks by new division head Bonnie Hammer, and the appointment of Frances Berwick as the head of Oxygen and sister network Bravo, it was revealed that Oxygen would undergo a shift in its programming strategy to focus on a "modern", young female audience. Berwick explained that the new slate, which included upcoming series such as Fix My Choir, Funny Girls, Nail'd It, Sisterhood of Hip Hop, Street Art Throwdown, and planned spin-offs of Preachers of L.A., would "deliver on the freshness, authenticity, high emotional stakes and optimism that this demographic is looking for", and that many of the new programs would "appeal to things that are important in the lives of young, millennial women" and be "authentic". As part of the re-focusing, the network also introduced a new slogan, "Very Real".

Refocus on true crime
In December 2016, it was reported that NBCUniversal was considering reformatting Oxygen as a true crime-oriented channel. Since 2015, the genre had seen growing interest, especially among young adult women. The network had introduced a primetime block known as Crime Time on Fridays through Mondays (anchored by series such as Snapped), which had helped Oxygen see a 42% increase in total viewership, and a 22% increase among women 25–54. NBCUniversal had reportedly been in talks with Dick Wolf—producer of NBC's Law & Order and Chicago franchises—to take an equity stake in a re-branded channel that could be led by reruns of the programs. In January 2017, the network also began a foray into podcasting, with the true crime series Martinis & Murder.

In February 2017, NBCUniversal confirmed that it planned to re-format Oxygen with a focus on true crime programming aimed towards women. The change was accompanied by a larger re-branding later in the year, with a new logo featuring the Oxygen name rendered in the style of yellow police tape. Oxygen's new lineup was built largely around its existing library of unscripted true-crime programming, such as Snapped and its various spin-offs. NBCUniversal Lifestyle Networks president Frances Berwick explained that they had not ruled out adding off-network reruns of police procedurals, such as the Chicago, CSI and NCIS franchises as well (with the latter two having already been aired by the network by that time). Berwick stated that the network had not determined the fate of the network's non-crime programming, such as Bad Girls Club, after the full re-branding takes effect.

During its upfront presentations, Oxygen unveiled other new crime programs that were in development for the upcoming season, such the new Dick Wolf series Criminal Confessions, a docuseries on the murder of Jessica Chambers co-produced with NBCUniversal-funded BuzzFeed, and a new season of Wolf's Cold Justice (which had been cancelled by TNT). In September 2017, Oxygen and USA Network acquired off-network reruns of Chicago P.D., which were added to their schedules in October 2017.

On May 2, 2022, NBCUniversal began to carry Oxygen as a subchannel on digital terrestrial television, primarily on NBC and Telemundo owned and operated stations.

Programming

Current
Buried in the Backyard
911 Crisis Center
Cold Justice
Dateline: Secrets Uncovered
Homicide for the Holidays
Killer Siblings
Snapped
Mark of a Killer
Final Moments
Accident, Suicide or Murder

Past

50 Funniest Women Alive
Addicted to Beauty
All About Aubrey
All My Babies' Mamas
All the Right Moves
As She Sees It
Bachelorette Party: Las Vegas
Bad Girls All-Star Battle
Bad Girls Club
Bad Girls Club: Afterparty
Bad Girls Club: Flo Gets Married
Bad Girls Road Trip
Battle of the Ex Besties
Behind the Shield
Best Ink
Birth Stories
Bliss
Breaking Up with Shannen Doherty
Breakup Girl
Bring Home the Exotic
Brooklyn 11223
Campus Ladies
Can You Tell?
Candice Checks It Out
Captured
 Celebrities Undercover
 Chasing Maria Menounos
Cheryl Richardson's Lifestyle Makeovers
Choose to Lead
Coolio's Rules
Conversations from the Edge with Carrie Fisher
Criminal Confessions
The DNA of Murder with Paul Holes
Daily Remix
Dance Your Ass Off
Deadly Cults
Death at the Mansion: Rebecca Zahau
Debbie Travis' Painted House
Deion & Pilar: Prime Time Love
The Disappearance of Crystal Rogers
The Disappearance of Maura Murray
The Disappearance of Natalee Holloway
The Disappearance of Phoenix Coldon
The Disappearance of Susan Cox Powell
Dogs with Jobs
Douglas Family Gold
Drastic Plastic Surgery
Dying to Belong
Eavesdropping with Alan Cummings
eLove
Exhale with Candice Bergen
The Face
Facelift
Fight Girls
Find Me My Man
Fix My Choir
Fix My Mom
Florida Man Murders
The Forgotten West Memphis Three
Framed By The Killer
Freeride with Greta Gaines
Funny Girls
The Girl In the Picture
Girlfriend Confidential: LA
Girls Behaving Badly
The Glee Project
Good Girls Don't
Hair Battle Spectacular
Hey Monie!
Hollywood Unzipped: Stylist Wars
House of Glam
In Ice Cold Blood
Injustice with Nancy Grace
It Takes a Killer
I'm Having Their Baby
Inhale Yoga with Steve Ross
The Isaac Mizrahi Show
Inshallah: Diary of an Afghan Woman
Ivana Young Man
I've Got a Secret
Jane By Design
Janice & Abbey
The Janice Dickinson Modeling Agency
Jersey Couture
The Jury Speaks
Just Cause
ka-Ching
Keisha and Kaseem
Kids Behaving Badly
Killer Affair
Killer Motive
Killerpost
Killision Course
Kim Kardashian West: The Justice Project
Last Squad Standing
Laura Pedersen's Your Money and Your Life
License to Kill
A Lie to Die For
Life & Style
Life's a Bitch
Like A Boss
Living Different
Living With Funny
Love Games: Bad Girls Need Love Too
Making It Big
Man Talk with Carrie Fisher
Me Time
Mo'Nique's Fat Chance
Movies@Oxygen
Mr. Romance
Murdered by Morning
My Big Fat Revenge
My Crazy Love
My Shopping Addiction
Murder and Justice: The Case of Martha Moxley
Nail'd It!
Naked Josh
The Naughty Kitchen with Chef Blythe Beck
The Next Big Thing: NY
Nice Package
O2Be
Oprah After the Show
Oprah Goes Online
Our Bodies, Myself (web series only)
Oxygen Movies
Oxygen Sports
Oxygen's 25iest
Pajama Party
Peep Show (as the first US telecaster; the UK sitcom was initially paired with the Canadian Show Me Yours as a Saturday-night provocative comedy bloc.)
Player Gets Played
Policewomen Files
Pond Life
The Prancing Elites Project
Preachers of Atlanta
Preachers of Detroit
Preachers of L.A.
Pretty Wicked
Pure Oxygen
Quigley's Village
Real Families
The Real Murders of Orange County
Relentless
Real Weddings From the Knot
Repo Girls
Ripe Tomatoes
Running Russell Simmons
SheCommerce
Show Me Yours
Sisterhood of Hip Hop
Skin Deep
Snapped: Killer Couples
Snapped: She Made Me Do It
Sports Aside
Show Me Yours
Street Art Throwdown 
Strut
Sunday Night Sex Show
Talk Sex with Sue Johanson
Tanisha Gets Married
Tattoos After Dark
Tease
Three Days to Live
Too Young to Marry?
Top Model Obsessed
Tracey Ullman's Visible Panty Lines
Trackers
Tori & Dean: Home Sweet Hollywood
Tori & Dean: Inn Love
Tori & Dean: sTORIbook Weddings
Trippin' with May Lee
An Unexpected Killer
Unprotected
Unspeakable Crime: The Killing of Jessica Chambers
Up and Vanished
Use Your Life
A Wedding and a Murder
We Sweat
Who Cares About Girls?
Who Does She Think She Is?
Who Needs Hollywood?
Women and the Badge
The World According to Paris
Worst.Post.Ever, with Frankie Grande
Worth the Risk
X-Chromosome
You're on TV

Syndicated

Absolutely Fabulous
America's Got Talent
America's Next Top Model
Buffy the Vampire Slayer
Burn Notice
Chicago P.D.
CSI: Crime Scene Investigation
Cybill
A Different World
Ellen
The Gospel Bill Show
Glee
Grace Under Fire
House
Kate & Allie
La Femme Nikita
Law & Order: Criminal Intent
Living Single
Mad About You
Major Crimes
Minute to Win It
My Wife & Kids
NCIS
Ned & Stacey
Nighty Night
Roseanne
Suburban Shootout
Xena: Warrior Princess

Oxygen HD
Oxygen HD was launched in March 2011 as high definition simulcast feed, eventually becoming the main feed with the standard definition feed being originated at the cable provider headend through downscaling. It is available through most providers.

References

External links

Television networks in the United States
NBCUniversal networks
Former subsidiaries of The Walt Disney Company
Television channels and stations established in 2000
English-language television stations in the United States
Women's interest channels
True crime